Brasseaux is a surname. Notable people with the surname include:

Carl A. Brasseaux (born 1951), American historian
Ryan Brasseaux (born 1976), American academic and writer, son of Carl